Florin Lambagiu (born 8 April 1996) is a Romanian professional kickboxer, former sambist and mixed martial artist. He currently competes in the super middleweight division of the Dynamite Fighting Show (DFS), where he is the former DFS 4 tournament winner and was named Fighter of the Year in 2019. Lambagiu also competed for Colosseum Tournament, where he is the former Colosseum Tournament World Light Welterweight Champion.  

As a sambist, Lambagiu primarily competed at 90 kilograms, and was the 2018 Romania National champion. He represented his country at the 2018 World Sambo Championships in Bucharest and at the 2018 European Sambo Championships in Athens. Besides sambo, he is also a national champion in MMA and kickboxing.

As of 4 January 2023, Lambagiu is ranked the #2 super-welterweight kickboxer in the world by Boxemag.

Background
Lambagiu comes from a poor family with four children. The family lived in an adobe house in the village of Lunca Rateș, Iași County. As a child, he helped his father in the forest, then went to work in construction. After finishing eighth grade, Lambagiu lived on his own because he did not want his family to support him. He worked on construction sites. Lambagiu admits he had a happy childhood.

Kickboxing career
Lambagiu signed with Romanian organization Colosseum Tournament in 2017 and became their inaugural Colosseum Tournament World Light Welterweight Champion in the same year. 

In May 2018, Lambagiu fought Artur Kyshenko to a draw in a three on one match. In September 2019, Lambagiu defeated at Dynamite Fighting Show 5: Team Moroșanu vs. Team Bonjasky the former SUPERKOMBAT light heavyweight champion Daniel Stefanovski by unanimous decision. As of 19 August 2020, he was the #7 ranked super welterweight in the world, according to the International Professional Combat Council (IPCC).

Benzaquen controversy
Lambagiu faced Cyril Benzaquen on May 31, 2022 for the ISKA World Light Heavyweight Championship at Grand Palais Éphémère in Paris, France. He lost the fight via a controversial unanimous decision. The result was disputed by ISKA who blamed the French federation for it.

Kickboxing style
Nicknamed "Rambo", Lambagiu is a strong fighter possessing considerable punching power, being one of the best body punchers on the Romanian kickboxing scene, and powerful hooks.

Personal life 
He is married and has a son, Yanis Matei (b. 2021). Sebastian Cozmâncă is godfather for this child.

Championships and accomplishments

Kickboxing 
Dynamite Fighting Show  
2022 Most Popular Fighter of the Year 
2019 Fighter of the Year
Dynamite Fighting Show 4 Welterweight Tournament Winner
Performance of the Night (Three times) vs. Claudiu Bădoi and Flavius Boiciuc, Alexandru Radnev, and Daniel Stefanovski
Fight of the Night (Two times) vs. Alexandru Radnev and Daniel Stefanovski
Kyokushin World Union
2021 KWU Middleweight Championship (Current)
Colosseum Tournament
2017 Colosseum Tournament World Light Welterweight Championship (Inaugural)

Sambo
Romanian Sambo Federation
Romania Sambo National Championship (2018)

Kickboxing record

|-
|-  bgcolor="#CCFFCC"
| 2023-03-17 || Win ||align=left| Lewis Childs || Kombat London 1 || London, England || TKO (referee stoppage) || 2 || 0:59
|-
|-  bgcolor="#CCFFCC"
| 2023-02-18 || Win ||align=left| Mickaël Lopes Da Veiga || Senshi 15 || Varna, Bulgaria || KO (right hook) || 1 || 2:59
|-
|-  bgcolor="#CCFFCC"
| 2023-01-28 || Win ||align=left| Christian Guiderdone || Road to DFS 1 || Turin, Italy || KO (right hook) || 2 || 0:15
|-
|-  bgcolor="#CCFFCC"
| 2022-12-08 || Win ||align=left| Majid Amarouche || Dynamite Fighting Show 17 || Constanța, Romania || TKO (three knockdowns) || 4 || 2:35
|-
|-  style="background:#fbb;"
| 2022-10-19 || Loss ||align=left| Diaguely Camara || Dynamite Fighting Show 16 || Iași, Romania || Decision (unanimous) || 3 || 3:00 
|-
|-  bgcolor="#CCFFCC"
| 2022-09-10 || Win ||align=left| Mehdi Ait El Hadj || Senshi 13 || Varna, Bulgaria || Extra round decision (split) || 4 || 3:00  
|- 
|-  bgcolor="#CCFFCC"
| 2022-07-09 || Win ||align=left| Ünal Alkayış || Senshi 12 || Varna, Bulgaria || KO (left hook) || 2 || 0:30
|- 
|-  bgcolor="#CCFFCC"
| 2022-06-24 || Win ||align=left| Burak Ünal || Dynamite Fighting Show 15 || Buzău, Romania || KO (liver shot) || 2 || 3:00
|-
|-  style="background:#fbb;"
| 2022-05-31 || Loss ||align=left| Cyril Benzaquen || Kickboxing Prestige || Paris, France || Decision (unanimous) || 5 || 3:00  
|-
! style=background:white colspan=9 |
|-
|-  bgcolor="#CCFFCC"
| 2022-05-06 || Win ||align=left| Bassó Pires || Dynamite Fighting Show 14 || Bucharest, Romania || TKO (towel thrown) || 4 || 1:54
|-
|-  bgcolor="#CCFFCC"
| 2022-02-26 || Win ||align=left| Ehsan Sajed || Senshi 11 || Varna, Bulgaria || TKO (referee stoppage) || 2 || 2:24
|-
|-  style="background:#fbb;"
| 2021-12-15 || Loss ||align=left| Constantin Rusu || Dynamite Fighting Show 13 || Bucharest, Romania || Decision (unanimous) || 3 || 3:00  
|-
|-  bgcolor="#CCFFCC"
| 2021-09-22 || Win ||align=left| Andrei Ostrovanu || Dynamite Fighting Show 12 || Baia Mare, Romania || Decision (unanimous) || 3 || 3:00  
|- 
|-  bgcolor="#CCFFCC"
| 2021-07-10 || Win ||align=left| Andrei Chekhonin || Senshi 9 || Varna, Bulgaria || Extra round decision (split) || 4 || 3:00    
|-
! style=background:white colspan=9 |
|-
|-  bgcolor="#CCFFCC"
| 2021-06-04 || Win ||align=left| Petros Vardakas || |Dynamite Fighting Show 11 || Bucharest, Romania || Decision (unanimous) || 3 || 3:00    
|-
|-  bgcolor="#CCFFCC"
| 2021-03-10 || Win ||align=left| Ion Grigore || Dynamite Fighting Show 10 || Bucharest, Romania || Decision (split) || 3 || 3:00     
|- 
|-  bgcolor="#CCFFCC"
| 2019-11-21 || Win ||align=left| Anatoli Ciumac || Dynamite Fighting Show 6: David vs. Goliath || Iași, Romania || Decision (unanimous) || 3 || 3:00    
|-
|-  bgcolor="#CCFFCC"
| 2019-09-27 || Win ||align=left| Daniel Stefanovski || Dynamite Fighting Show 5: Team Moroșanu vs. Team Bonjasky || Piatra Neamț, Romania || Decision (unanimous) || 3 || 3:00    
|-
|-  bgcolor="#CCFFCC"
| 2019-06-06 || Win ||align=left| Flavius Boiciuc || Dynamite Fighting Show 4, Final || Cluj-Napoca, Romania || KO (left hook) || 1 || 2:57   
|- 
! style=background:white colspan=9 |
|-
|-  bgcolor="#CCFFCC"
| 2019-06-06 || Win ||align=left| Claudiu Bădoi || Dynamite Fighting Show 4, Semi Final || Cluj-Napoca, Romania || Decision (unanimous) || 3 || 3:00   
|-
|-  style="background:#c5d2ea;"
| 2019-05-01 || Draw ||align=left| Artur Kyshenko || MAS Fight Ling Shan Grand Prix || Sichuan, China || Draw || 1 || 3:00   
|-
|-  bgcolor="#CCFFCC"
| 2018-10-19 || Win ||align=left| Alexandru Radnev || Dynamite Fighting Show 2 || Piatra Neamț, Romania || Decision (unanimous) || 3 || 3:00  
|-
|-  style="background:#fbb;"
| 2018-04-20 || Loss ||align=left| Flavius Boiciuc || Colosseum Tournament 6 || Iași, Romania || Decision (unanimous) || 3 || 3:00  
|-
|-  bgcolor="#CCFFCC"
| 2017-10-16 || Win ||align=left| Mirel Drăgan || Colosseum Tournament 4 || Bucharest, Romania || TKO (three knockdowns) || 1 || 1:51 
|- 
! style=background:white colspan=9 |
|- 
|-  bgcolor="#CCFFCC"
| 2017-06-17 || Win ||align=left| Cristian Stoica || Colosseum Tournament 2 || Ploiești, Romania || KO (left hook) || 4 || 1:01  
|- 
! style=background:white colspan=9 |
|- 
|-  bgcolor="#CCFFCC"
| 2016-10-01 || Win ||align=left| Denis Teleshman || KOK Hero’s Series || Chișinău, Moldova || Decision (unanimous) || 3 || 3:00 
|- 
|-  bgcolor="#CCFFCC"
| 2016-08-?? || Win ||align=left| Izidor Bunea || World Mixed Fights || Bucharest, Romania || Decision (split) || 3 || 3:00 
|-
|-
| colspan=9 | Legend:

See also 
List of male kickboxers

References

External links
 Official Dynamite Fighting Show profile
 Sherdog profile

1996 births
Living people
People from Iași County
Romanian male kickboxers
Middleweight kickboxers
Light heavyweight kickboxers
Cruiserweight kickboxers 
Romanian male mixed martial artists
Welterweight mixed martial artists 
Mixed martial artists utilizing sambo
Romanian sambo practitioners
Eastern Orthodox Christians from Romania